The Scottish Text Society (STS) is a text publication society founded in 1882 to promote the study of Scottish literature. The Society publishes scholarly editions of important texts from the country's literary history, and has played a significant role in the revival of interest in the literature and languages of Scotland.

To date, the Society has published approximately 150 volumes, from the 14th to the 19th centuries, but with a focus on Middle Scots works of the 16th to 18th centuries. These editions include poetry, drama and prose works.

Professor Sally Mapstone Principal and Vice-Chancellor of the University of St Andrews is Honorary President of the Society.

Notable publications
 The Brus, by John Barbour
 The Actes and Deidis of the Illustre and Vallyeant Campioun Schir William Wallace, by Blind Hary
 The Buke of the Law of Armys, by Gilbert Hay
 The Shorter Poems of Gavin Douglas
 Virgil's Aeneid, Translated into Scottish Verse by Gavin Douglas, Bishop of Dunkeld
 The works of Alexander Montgomerie
 History of the House of Angus, by David Hume
 The Complaynt of Scotland
 The New Testament in Scots, by Murdoch Nisbet.

In 2014, the Society launched a new publication of the original poem Buke of the Howlat.

See also
 Scottish Gaelic Texts Society

References

External links
 Official website

Book publishing companies of Scotland
Medieval literature
1882 establishments in Scotland
Learned societies of Scotland
Organizations established in 1882
Organisations based in Edinburgh
Scots-language works
Scots-language mass media
Text publication societies
History of literature in Scotland